Vinko Begović (born 2 October 1948) is a Croatian football manager and former player.

Managerial career
He has previously served as head coach of several clubs namely Foolad, Persepolis and Pegah Gilan of Iran, and Al-Wasl of the UAE. He was also manager of the Iran national under-23 football team for a short period in 2007. From December 2012 to March 2013, he was also assistant coach at Persepolis and also head coach of Persepolis B for three months.

References

1948 births
Living people
Footballers from Split, Croatia
Association footballers not categorized by position
Yugoslav footballers
HNK Hajduk Split players
FK Sloga Kraljevo players
FK Radnički 1923 players
RNK Split players
Yugoslav First League players
Yugoslav football managers
Croatian football managers
RNK Split managers
HNK Šibenik managers
Foolad F.C. managers
Persepolis F.C. managers
Al-Wasl F.C. managers
Pas Hamedan F.C. managers
Aluminium Hormozgan F.C. managers
Sanat Mes Kerman F.C. managers
Mes Rafsanjan F.C. managers
Gol Gohar Sirjan F.C. managers
Croatian expatriate football managers
Expatriate football managers in Iran
Croatian expatriate sportspeople in Iran
Expatriate football managers in the United Arab Emirates
Croatian expatriate sportspeople in the United Arab Emirates
Persian Gulf Pro League managers